Navojoa Municipality is a municipality in Sonora in north-western Mexico. As of 2015, the municipality had a total population of 163,650.

Demographics
Navojoa is the fifth-largest municipality in Sonora (after Hermosillo, Cajeme, Nogales and San Luis Río Colorado) with a population of 163,650 as of 2015.

Borders

The municipality shares its boundaries with Cajeme Municipality and Quiriego Municipality in the north, with Álamos Municipality in the east, with Huatabampo Municipality in the southwest and with Etchojoa Municipality in the west.

Localities
Other towns, near the municipal seat are San Ignacio Cohuirimpo, Guadalupe, Guayparin, Tetanchopo, Santa María del Bauraje, Agiabampo, Masiaca, Bacabachi, and Pueblo Viejo.

Physical geography
The region lies in the valley of the Mayo River, which crosses it from the northeast to the southwest.

Transport
Transportation through the municipality is carried out by highway, railway, and airplane.  Highway Mex 15 crosses the region from the northeast to the southeast.  There is also an extensive network of tarmacked roads, connecting the municipal seat with the agricultural communities in the Mayo valley.
The railway runs parallel to the national highway crossing the region.  There is a regional airport in the municipal seat.

Government

Municipal presidents

Economy
One quarter of the municipality (1,160 km2) is occupied by irrigated agricultural lands, growing wheat, corn, soybeans, and garden vegetables.

There is also large production of swine and poultry.  Navojoa produces almost half of the state production in these areas.  The cattle herd had over 30,000 head according to the 2000 census. 

Industry is modest, although there are one beer factory, owned by Cerveceria Cuauhtemoc Moctezuma / Heineken, and a cardboard packing factory named Celulosa y Corrugados de Sonora, S.A. de C.V.

References

Municipalities of Sonora